Teryoshkin or Tereshkin is a Russian masculine surname, its feminine counterpart is Teryoshkina or Tereshkina. It may refer to
Viktoria Tereshkina (born 1983), Russian ballet dancer
Vladislav Teryoshkin (born 1995), Russian football player

Russian-language surnames